In enzymology, a protein-serine epimerase is an enzyme that catalyzes the chemical reaction

[protein]-L-serine  [protein]-D-serine

Hence, this enzyme has one substrate, [protein]-L-serine, and one product, [protein]-D-serine.

This enzyme belongs to the family of isomerases, specifically those racemases and epimerases acting on amino acids and derivatives.  The systematic name of this enzyme class is [protein]-serine epimerase. This enzyme is also called protein-serine racemase.

Structural studies

As of late 2007, only one structure has been solved for this class of enzymes, with the PDB accession code .

References

 

EC 5.1.1
Enzymes of known structure